Krasnaya Gora is a rural locality (a village) in Yenangskoye Rural Settlement, Kichmengsko-Gorodetsky District, Vologda Oblast, Russia. The population was 12 as of 2002.

Geography 
Krasnaya Gora is located 52 km east of Kichmengsky Gorodok (the district's administrative centre) by road. Pakhomovo is the nearest rural locality.

References 

Rural localities in Kichmengsko-Gorodetsky District